The American Journal of Orthodontics and Dentofacial Orthopedics is a monthly peer-reviewed medical journal covering orthodontic research. It is published by Elsevier and is the official journal of the American Association of Orthodontists. The editor-in-chief is Rolf G. Behrents (Saint Louis University). The journal was established in 1915 and obtained its current name in 1986. Previous names include American Journal of Orthodontics and American Journal of Orthodontics and Oral Surgery.

Abstracting and indexing
The journal is abstracted and indexed in CINAHL, Index Medicus/MEDLINE/PubMed, and Scopus. According to the Journal Citation Reports, the journal has a 2014 impact factor of 1.382.

References

External links 
 

Elsevier academic journals
Monthly journals
Publications established in 1897
English-language journals
Dentistry journals
Orthodontics